Still Got the Blues is the eighth solo studio album by Northern Irish guitarist Gary Moore, released in March 1990. It marked a substantial change in style for Moore, who had been predominantly known for rock and hard rock music with Skid Row, Thin Lizzy, G-Force, Greg Lake and during his own extensive solo career, as well as his jazz-fusion work with Colosseum II. As indicated by its title, Still Got the Blues saw him delve into an electric blues style.

The album features guest contributions from Albert King, Albert Collins and George Harrison.

The title track was released as a single and reached No. 97 on the Billboard Hot 100 on 16 February 1991. It is the only single of Moore's to chart on the Billboard Hot 100.

The album reached No. 83 on the Billboard 200 on 16 February 1991, then was certified gold by the RIAA in November 1995. This was Moore's most successful album both in terms of sales and chart position in the US.

Track listing
Side One
 "Moving On" - (Gary Moore) - 2:39
 Gary Moore - guitar, vocals
 Mick Weaver - piano
 Andy Pyle - bass
 Graham Walker - drums
 "Oh Pretty Woman" - (A. C. Williams) - 4:25
 Gary Moore - guitar, vocals
 Albert King - guitar
 Raoul D'Olivera - trumpet
 Frank Mead - alto and tenor saxophones
 Nick Pentelow - tenor saxophone
 Nick Payn - baritone saxophone
 Don Airey - Hammond organ
 Andy Pyle - bass
 Graham Walker - drums
 "Walking By Myself" - (Jimmy Rogers) - 2:56
 Gary Moore - guitar, vocals
 Frank Mead - harmonica
 Mick Weaver - piano
 Andy Pyle - bass
 Graham Walker - drums
 "Still Got the Blues (For You)" - (Moore) - 6:12
 Gary Moore - guitar, vocals
 Gavyn Wright - leader of the string section
 Don Airey - keyboards
 Nicky Hopkins - piano
 Andy Pyle - bass
 Graham Walker - drums
 "Texas Strut" - (Moore) - 4:51
 Gary Moore - guitar, vocals
 Don Airey - Hammond organ
 Bob Daisley - bass
 Brian Downey - drums
Side Two
 "Too Tired" - (Johnny "Guitar" Watson, Maxwell Davies, Saul Bihari) - 2:51
 Gary Moore - guitar, vocals
 Albert Collins - guitar
 Stuart Brooks - trumpet
 Frank Mead - alto saxophone
 Nick Pentelow - tenor saxophone
 Nick Payn - baritone saxophone
 Don Airey - piano
 Andy Pyle - bass
 Graham Walker - drums
 "King of the Blues" - (Moore) - 4:36
 Gary Moore - guitar, vocals
 Raoul D'Olivera - trumpet
 Frank Mead - alto and tenor saxophones
 Nick Pentelow - tenor saxophone
 Nick Payn - baritone saxophone
 Don Airey - Hammond organ
 Andy Pyle - bass
 Brian Downey - drums
 "As the Years Go Passing By" - (Deadric Malone) - 7:46
 Gary Moore - guitar, vocals
 Frank Mead - tenor saxophones
 Nick Payn - baritone saxophone
 Don Airey - Hammond organ
 Nicky Hopkins - piano
 Bob Daisley - bass
 Brian Downey - drums
 "Midnight Blues" - (Moore) - 4:58
 Gary Moore - guitar, vocals
 Gavyn Wright - leader of the string section
 Mick Weaver - electric piano
 Andy Pyle - bass
 Graham Walker - drums
CD Release Bonus Tracks
 "That Kind of Woman" - (George Harrison) - 4:32
 Gary Moore - lead guitar, lead vocals
 George Harrison - rhythm and slide guitars, backing vocals
 Martin Drover - trumpet
 Frank Mead - alto saxophone
 Nick Pentelow - tenor saxophone
 Nick Payn - baritone saxophone
 Nicky Hopkins - piano
 Bob Daisley - bass
 Graham Walker - drums
 "All Your Love" - Otis Rush - 3:32
 Gary Moore - guitar, vocals
 Mick Weaver - Hammond organ
 Andy Pyle - bass
 Graham Walker - drums
 "Stop Messin' Around" - (Clifford Davis, Peter Green) - 4:00
 Gary Moore - guitar, vocals
 Frank Mead - saxophone
 Mick Weaver - piano
 Andy Pyle - bass
 Graham Walker - drums

Personnel
Gary Moore - lead vocals, lead and rhythm guitars
Don Airey - keyboards
Stuart Brooks - trumpet
Albert Collins - guitar
Bob Daisley - bass guitar
Raul d'Oliveira - trumpet
Brian Downey - drums
Martin Drover - trumpet
George Harrison - guitar, vocals
Nicky Hopkins - keyboards
Albert King - guitar
Frank Mead - saxophone
Nick Payn - saxophone
Nick Pentelow - saxophone
Andy Pyle - bass guitar
Graham Walker - drums
Mick Weaver - piano
Gavyn Wright - strings

Chart positions

Weekly charts

Year-end charts

Certifications

References 

Gary Moore albums
1990 albums
Virgin Records albums
Charisma Records albums
Albums involved in plagiarism controversies